This list includes Immovable Cultural Heritage sites in the Toplica District of Serbia.

Liste

See also 
Immovable Cultural Heritage of Great Importance (Serbia)

References

Cultural heritage of Serbia
Monuments and memorials in Serbia